Sannatasah Saniru (born 15 May 1990) is a badminton player from Malaysia. Her brother, Vountus Indra Mawan also a former Malaysia national player.

Career 
Saniru was accepted at the Bukit Jalil Sports School at the age of 13, then she join the Malaysia national team. In 2008, she won the mixed team bronze at the Asian and World Junior Championships, and in 2009, she won the women' team gold at the Southeast Asian Games. In 2010, she was selected to compete at the Uber Cup, and also Guangzhou Asian Games. She quits the national team in 2013, and started to playing under the Suruhanjaya Perkhidamtan  badminton club. She stated in her resignation letter that she did not get as many opportunities as the other players to compete, and there had been no improvement in her game. In 2015, she took part at the Summer Universiade in Gwangju, South Korea, and won a bronze medal in the mixed team event.

Achievements

BWF International Challenge/Series (1 title, 5 runners-up) 
Women's singles

Women's doubles

Mixed doubles

  BWF International Challenge tournament
  BWF International Series tournament

References

External links 
 

1990 births
Living people
People from Sabah
Malaysian people of Indian descent
Malaysian female badminton players
Badminton players at the 2010 Asian Games
Asian Games competitors for Malaysia
Competitors at the 2009 Southeast Asian Games
Southeast Asian Games gold medalists for Malaysia
Southeast Asian Games medalists in badminton
Universiade bronze medalists for Malaysia
Universiade medalists in badminton
Medalists at the 2015 Summer Universiade
21st-century Malaysian women